Craig Foster is a South African documentary filmmaker, naturalist, and founder of the Sea Change Project. He is known for the 2020 film My Octopus Teacher, for which he won an Academy Award in 2021.

Career
In 2012, Foster co-founded the Sea Change Project, a nonprofit group to protect marine life and raise awareness of the importance of the kelp forest in South Africa.

When making The Great Dance: A Hunter's Story (2000) and My Hunter's Heart (2010), he learned some of the animal tracking techniques from the San people of the Kalahari Desert.

My Octopus Teacher

Foster was the subject, producer, and photographer of a 2020 Netflix Original film called My Octopus Teacher, directed by Pippa Ehrlich and James Reed. The movie is about his experience diving in the kelp forests at a remote location in False Bay, near Cape Town, in the Western Cape of South Africa. During that time, he found a common octopus who began to trust him, and he revisited and filmed her every day for that year. Foster started filming in 2010 and the project was ten years in the making. It was the first Netflix Original South African nature documentary.

Underwater footage not shown in the movie but filmed by the same team, at the same location, and about the same subject, had been shown previously on Blue Planet II, episode 5.

Recognition
During the course of his underwater tracking, Foster discovered eight new species of shrimp. One of them, Heteromysis fosteri, was named after him.

Personal life
Foster is married to Indian documentary filmmaker and environmental journalist Swati Thiyagarajan. He has a son, Tom, by his former wife.

Publications
Foster is the co-author of Sea Change – Primal Joy and the Art of Underwater Tracking.

Selected filmography
Foster's film projects include:
 The Great Dance: A Hunter's Story (2000, director)
 Africa Unbottled (2001, director)
 Cosmic Africa (2003, director)
 My Hunter's Heart (2010, director)
 Into the Dragon's Lair (2010, cinematographer)
 Wild Walk (2010 television series, director)
 The Animal Communicator (2012, director, producer)
 Touching the Dragon (2013, director)
 Dragons Feast (2014 television documentary film, director)
 My Octopus Teacher (2020, producer, cinematographer, subject)

References

External links
 
 Sea Change Project
 The making of My Octopus Teacher

South African documentary filmmakers
People from Cape Town
Living people
Year of birth missing (living people)
Producers who won the Best Documentary Short Subject Academy Award